The governor of Altai Krai is the chief executive of Altai Krai, a federal subject of Russia.

History of office 
Before 2007 amendment to the Charter of Altai Krai the office was styled as the Head of Altai Krai Administration.

List of officeholders

References 

Politics of Altai Krai
 
Altai Krai